Arnøyhamn is a village in Skjervøy Municipality in Troms og Finnmark county, Norway. The village is located on the southern shore of the island of Arnøya. Arnøy Church is located in this village.

References

Villages in Troms
Skjervøy